Dimbsthal is a commune in the Bas-Rhin department in Grand Est in north-eastern France.

History 
The name of the commune is officially mentioned for the first time in 1120. At that time, it was ruled by the Marmoutier Abbey.

Sport 
The village hosted the Grand Est regional amateur cycling championships in 2018.

Historical heritage and architecture 
The church Saint-Symphorien is located in Dimbsthal.

The village also include an old water fountain. It was built in 1889 and is no longer in activity.

See also
 Communes of the Bas-Rhin department

References

Communes of Bas-Rhin